Jeremy Trebas (born June 3, 1984) is an American politician who is serving in the Montana House of Representatives from the 26th district since 2021 and previously in the 25th district from 2017 to 2019.

References

1984 births
Living people
Republican Party members of the Montana House of Representatives